Alfredo Gatica (born 8 February 1988) is a Mexican television actor; best known for his role of Ricardo in the Televisa telenovela La vecina (2015–2016). His other TV roles include: Orlando in the 2016 telenovela Tres veces Ana, adaptation of the 1996 telenovela Lazos de amor. Rulo in Enamorándome de Ramón, Mexican adaptation of the Venezuelan telenovela Tomasa Tequiero, and El Turco Nasif in the Mexican adaptation of the Argentine telenovela Sos mi hombre. Alfredo is the nephew of Luis Gatica, and grandson of Lucho Gatica and Mapita Cortés.

Life

He was born in Mexico City on 8 February 1988. He studied at Televisa's CEA and graduated in 2010, where he began playing several small roles in the unitary series such as Como dice el dicho and La rosa de Guadalupe.

In 2012 he made his debut in the telenovela Cachito de cielo with the character of 'Darío' and where he shared credits with Maite Perroni, Pedro Fernández and Mané de la Parra.

In 2013 he gave life to 'Abdul García' in Lucero Suárez's telenovela De que te quiero, te quiero and where he shared the scene with Livia Brito, Juan Diego Covarrubias, Cynthia Klitbo and Fabiola Guajardo.

For 2015 he gets his first antagonistic role and the one that gave him the most acting relevance, in La vecina and again by the hand of the producer Lucero Suárez playing 'Ricardo Segura' along with Esmeralda Pimentel, Juan Diego Covarrubias, and Natalia Guerrero.

A year later in 2016 he gets a small role in Angelli Nesma Medina's telenovela Tres veces Ana where he gave life to 'Orlando'.

The following year (2017) for the third time the producer Lucero Suárez called him to impersonate 'Rulo' 'Grijalba' in Enamorándome de Ramón where he shares credits with José Ron and Esmeralda Pimentel.

Finally in 2019 he gave life to 'Ariel "El Turco" Nasif' in Ringo working for the fourth time alongside Lucero Suárez and sharing the scene alongside Mariana Torres, Jose Ron, Jorge Poza and Gabriela Carrillo.

Filmography

References

External links 
 

1988 births
Living people
Mexican male telenovela actors
Mexican people of Chilean descent
Mexican people of Basque descent
Mexican people of Puerto Rican descent
21st-century Mexican male actors